The Declaration on the Creation of the Union of Soviet Socialist Republics is a historical document which, together with the Treaty on the Creation of the USSR, formed the constitutional basis for the creation of the Union of Soviet Socialist Republics as a multinational state.

The Declaration stated the reasons necessitating the formation of a union between all existing Soviet republics into one united socialist state and expressed willingness to undertake a 'permanent revolution', exporting the Socialist Revolution to other states, primarily in the West, as evidenced by the recent Polish-Soviet War. The Declaration also stressed that the creation of the Union of the Soviet Socialist Republics was a voluntary union of peoples with equal rights, whereby each Soviet republic retained the right to freely secede from the Union, a provision that was used as the legal basis for the independence of several republics and the subsequent dissolution of the Union in 1991.

The draft declaration was endorsed on 29 December 1922, by a conference of plenipotentiary delegations from the Russian SFSR, the Ukrainian SSR, Byelorussian SSR, and the Transcaucasian SFSR. On 30 December 1922, the declaration together with the Treaty on the Establishment of the USSR was adopted by the First Congress of Soviets of the USSR. It was included as preamble in the Constitution of the USSR of 1924.

See also 

 October Revolution Day
 Treaty on the Creation of the USSR

References

Treaties of the Soviet Union
1922 in the Soviet Union
Treaties concluded in 1922
Treaties entered into force in 1922
Treaties of the Russian Soviet Federative Socialist Republic
Treaties of republics of the Soviet Union
Treaties of the Byelorussian Soviet Socialist Republic
Treaties of the Ukrainian Soviet Socialist Republic
Politics of the Soviet Union
December 1922 events
Proclamations